The 1980 United States presidential election in Missouri took place on November 4, 1980. All 50 states and the District of Columbia were part of the election. Voters chose 12 electors to the Electoral College, who voted for president and vice president.

The state was ultimately carried by Republican Ronald Reagan, who won 51.16% of the vote and went on to be elected president. Missouri therefore continued its bellwether streak, which it had maintained since 1904, voting for the ultimate presidential election winner every four years with the sole exception of the 1956 election.

Results

Results by county

See also
 United States presidential elections in Missouri

References

Missouri
1980
1980 Missouri elections